Newbold Astbury (also known as Astbury) is a civil parish in Cheshire East, England. It contains 25 buildings that are recorded in the National Heritage List for England as designated listed buildings.  Of these, one is listed at Grade I, the highest grade, three are listed at Grade II*, the middle grade, and the others are at Grade II.  The major settlement in the parish is the village of Astbury; its listed buildings include the church and associated structures, houses and cottages, and a telephone kiosk.  The Macclesfield Canal runs through the parish, and there are five listed buildings associated with this, three bridges, an aqueduct, and a milestone.  Otherwise the parish is rural, and the listed buildings are farmhouses, farm buildings, and a boundary stone.

Key

Buildings

References

Citations

Sources

 

Listed buildings in the Borough of Cheshire East
Lists of listed buildings in Cheshire